"Drama" is a song by Australian singer songwriter Kate Miller-Heidke and released in February 2014 as the first single from Miller-Heidke's fourth album O Vertigo!. "Drama" was written by Keir Nuttall and features vocals from Australian hip-hop artist Drapht.

Lyric video
No official music video has been made for "Drama", but a lyric video appeared on Miller-Heidke's official YouTube channel on 6 February 2014.

Track listing
Digital download
 "Drama (Feat. Drapht)" - 2:44

References

2014 singles
Kate Miller-Heidke songs
Songs written by Keir Nuttall
2014 songs
Sony BMG singles